A Good Man Is Hard to Find and Other Stories (published in the United Kingdom as The Artificial Nigger and Other Tales) is a collection of short stories by American author Flannery O'Connor. The collection was first published in 1955. The subjects of the short stories range from baptism ("The River") to serial killers ("A Good Man Is Hard to Find") to human greed and exploitation ("The Life You Save May Be Your Own"). The majority of the stories include jarring violent scenes that make the characters undergo a spiritual change. The short stories commonly have tones of Catholicism related to life and death scenarios. For instance, in the story "A Good Man Is Hard To Find" the villain states, "She would have been a good woman if it had been somebody there to shoot her every minute of her life."

Contents

It contains the following stories:
"A Good Man Is Hard to Find"
"The River"
"The Life You Save May Be Your Own"
"A Stroke of Good Fortune"
"A Temple of the Holy Ghost"
"The Artificial Nigger"
"A Circle in the Fire"
"A Late Encounter with the Enemy"
"Good Country People"
"The Displaced Person"

Title

O'Connor's story title was taken from the blues song, "A Good Man Is Hard to Find", written by Eddie Green and popularized by the singer Bessie Smith in 1927.

Adaptations
A television adaptation of the short story "The Life You Save May Be Your Own", starring Gene Kelly, was broadcast on the CBS network's Schlitz Playhouse on March 1, 1957. O'Connor was not pleased with the results, as evidenced in a letter to a friend: "The best I can say for it is that it conceivably could have been worse. Just conceivably."

A short film adaptation of the story "A Good Man Is Hard to Find", titled "Black Hearts Bleed Red", was released in 1993. The film was directed by New York filmmaker Jeri Cain Rossi and stars noted New York artist Joe Coleman.

Musician Sufjan Stevens wrote a song titled "A Good Man Is Hard to Find" on his album Seven Swans; it is told from the viewpoint of the Misfit even though he is not the focus of the story.

See also

Southern Gothic
Southern literature
The Grotesque

Footnotes

External links
Full text of the titular story from the collection.
Full text of "The Life You Save May Be Your Own."
A Good Man is Hard to Find from Google Books

1955 short story collections
Short story collections by Flannery O'Connor
Harcourt (publisher) books